Manuel 'Manu' Adolfo Busto Loza (born 7 October 1980) is a Spanish footballer who plays for FC Miengo as a forward.

Club career
Busto was born in Santander, Cantabria. He only played lower league football in his country, amassing Segunda División B totals of 381 games and 111 goals for Real Valladolid B, Pontevedra CF (two spells), CD Castellón, Real Jaén, Lorca Deportiva CF and Real Oviedo, over 12 seasons.

In the summer of 2013, aged nearly 33, Busto moved abroad, making his professional debut with Levadiakos FC. He played his first top-tier match on 26 August, coming on as a 55th minute substitute in a 2–0 away loss against Ergotelis F.C. in the Super League Greece.

External links

1980 births
Living people
Spanish footballers
Footballers from Santander, Spain
Association football forwards
Segunda División B players
Tercera División players
Divisiones Regionales de Fútbol players
Real Valladolid Promesas players
Pontevedra CF footballers
CD Castellón footballers
Real Jaén footballers
Lorca Deportiva CF footballers
Real Oviedo players
Club Portugalete players
CD Tropezón players
Super League Greece players
Levadiakos F.C. players
Spanish expatriate footballers
Expatriate footballers in Greece
Spanish expatriate sportspeople in Greece